Ruske kape (English: Russian Caps) are a type of cake dessert served in Balkan countries, especially in Bosnia and Herzegovina, Croatia and Serbia. The top is usually chocolate drizzled with vanilla. The center includes layers of alternating vanilla, chocolate, and sometimes a mocha flavor.

Background
The design of the confectionery itself is based on the papakha, a traditional shepherd's hat that is worn all throughout the mountainous Caucasus region, albeit the term "ruske kape" comes from the Russian Cossacks who wore the hat in the regiments they belonged to, hence its given name in the Balkans.

This dessert comes served chilled, usually on colorful plates drizzled with chocolate. It can be eaten with a fork but is sometimes eaten in a casual manner; people eat it like a cupcake with the hands.

Gallery

See also

 Coconut cake
 List of desserts

External links
 Ruske kape (Serbo-Croatian)

References

Cakes
Bosnia and Herzegovina cuisine
Serbian cuisine
Foods containing coconut
Chocolate desserts
Croatian desserts
Montenegrin cuisine